Dalby–Cecil Plains Road is a continuous  road route in the Western Downs and Toowoomba regions of Queensland, Australia. The road is signed as State Route 82. Dalby–Cecil Plains Road (number 325) is a state-controlled regional road.

Route Description
It runs south through  and  before turning south-west into . It ends at an intersection with Toowoomba–Cecil Plains Road, which runs east as State Route 82, and Taylor Street, which runs west to become Millmerran–Cecil Plains Road.

In St Ruth it passes exits to Springvale Road and Jondaryan–St Ruth Road, which combine to provide an alternative route from the Warrego Highway to the Moonie Highway. Land use along Dalby–Cecil Plains Road is almost exclusively crop farming. Within Cecil Plains the road follows the Condamine River.

Road condition
Dalby–Cecil Plains Road is fully sealed. The steepest incline on the road is only about 2%.

State Route 82
It is not necessarily the best or the shortest or the quickest route between the two terminii. It was proclaimed as a State Route because, at the time, it was the most convenient route for many users. It is also an example of why motorists in unfamiliar territory should follow a designated route rather than rely on a vehicle navigation system, which may direct them onto less suitable alternative roads. For example, the route from Tingoora to Inglewood suggested by a popular mapping system is quite different to State Route 82.

Here the Chinchilla–Wondai Road turns west, while State Route 82 continues south on Jandowae  Connection Road to Jandowae. In Jandowae the road name changes to Dalby–Jandowae Road, which continues to the Warrego Highway in the west of Dalby. From there it follows the Warrego Highway to the south-east until it reaches Dalby–Cecil Plains Road, where it continues south.

At a T-junction in Cecil Plains, State Route 82 turns east on Toowoomba–Cecil Plains Road until it reaches Pampas–Horrane Road, where it turns south. Note that many navigation systems will suggest a turn to the west in Cecil Plains, leading to Millmerran–Cecil Plains Road. This road continues south to Inglewood where it meets the Cunningham Highway at a T-junction.

History

The Dalby area was settled in the 1840s, and a township was surveyed in 1853 and founded in 1854. A post office opened in 1855 and a school in 1861. The railway arrived in 1868, allowing the town to grow as the commercial centre for properties around it.

The first roads on the Darling Downs were cut to provide access for wheeled vehicles to the pastoral runs and new settlements.

Cecil Plains pastoral run was established in 1842. St Ruth pastoral run, initially part of Cecil Plains, was separated in 1842. This resumption soon led to closer settlement and a demand for better roads to enable the commercial success of the new farms.

A postal receiving office opened in Cecil Plains in 1890, and the first school in 1898. Over time the areas along the line of road from Cecil Plains to Dalby were settled as farms of various sizes. In 1916, Cecil Plains station was acquired by the Queensland government and subdivided for closer settlement, with some parcels reserved for soldier settlers. The new settlers produced mainly wheat and dairy.

A reliable road connection to Dalby, which is the closest larger town, and was the closest railhead until 1919, was needed to provide access to markets and larger items of equipment.

Major intersections
All distances are from Google Maps.

See also

 List of road routes in Queensland
 List of numbered roads in Queensland

Notes

References

Roads in Queensland